Dynasty (season 3) may refer to:

 Dynasty (1981 TV series, season 3)
 Dynasty (2017 TV series, season 3)